Gregory James Hargrove (born March 4, 1959) is a former politician in New Brunswick, Canada.  He led the New Brunswick Confederation of Regions Party from 1995-1999.

Born in Fredericton, New Brunswick in 1959, he was elected to the Legislative Assembly of New Brunswick in the 1991 election along with seven other members of CoR.  He defeated incumbent Liberal Robert Simpson in the riding of York North, who had been elected as the first Liberal in the riding since 1953, in the 1987 Liberal sweep. The CoR party went through numerous leadership disputes, and Hargrove eventually became the leader in July 1995 shortly before that year's election.  He was defeated in his bid for re-election in the riding of Mactaquac, placing a strong third place.

The CoR party failed to win any seats in the legislature in the 1995 election. Hargrove attempted to re-enter the House in a 1997 by-election in Tantramar, but finished a distant fourth of four candidates, getting only 2.5% of the vote, compared to 10% for the CoR candidate two years earlier.

He continued to the lead the party until after the writs were dropped for the 1999 election, but declined to contest a seat and resigned the leadership.  He was replaced as leader by Jim Webb.

References 

 Entry from Canadian Who's Who

1959 births
New Brunswick Confederation of Regions Party MLAs
Living people
Politicians from Fredericton